Stary Olsa is a Belarusian medieval folk band, that plays medieval Ruthenian music of the Grand Duchy of Lithuania. The band has also released classical rock cover works in their Medieval Classic Rock where classical rock songs performed by bagpipes.

Stary Olsa is one of the few Belarusian bands enjoying popularity outside Belarus. The band has received numerous positive critical reviews. They are also known for covering modern rock tracks using their medieval instruments, and released a cover album, via a Kickstarter campaign, in 2016.

The band was founded in 1999 by Źmicier Sasnoŭski. The name Stary Olsa means "Old Olsa", where Olsa is a left tributary of Berezina in Mogilev Oblast, Belarus.

Discography

Albums 
Kielich Koła (2000)
Vir (2001)
Verbum (2002)
Šlach (2003)
Ładździa rospačy (2004)
Skarby litvinaŭ (2004)
Siaredniaviečnaja dyskateka (2005)
Hieraičny epas (Spevy rycarau i ŝliachty Vialikaj Litvy, 2006)
Drygula (2009)
Liepŝaje (The Best) (2009)
Santa Maria (2013)
Kola rycerska (2016)
Medieval Classic Rock (2016)
Water, Hops and Malt (2017)

Clips
 U karčmie (2004) - the Belarusian translation of the medieval song In taberna.
 VITAUT (2008)
 DRYHULA remix (2008)

Projects with other musicians
 Lehiendy Vialikaha Kniastva (2001)
 Lehiendy Vialikaha Kniastva - 2 (2004)
 Hienerały ajčynnaha roku (2004)
 Premjer Tuzin (2005)

Members

Current members
 Źmicier Sasnoŭski: bagpipes, lyre, mandolin, gusli, percussion, vocals
 Maryja Šaryj: flute, shawms
 Aleś Čumakoŭ: lyre, mandolin, gusli, vocals
 Illia Kublicki: lute, organ
 Siarhiej Tapčeŭski: drums, percussion, tromba marina
 Aliaksiej Vojciech: drums, percussion

Former members
 Andrej Apanovič (2002-2015): drums, bagpipe, flute alto, vocals
 Aksana Kaścian (2005-2007): flutes, shawms
 Kaciaryna Radziviłava (2002-2005): flutes, shawms
 Kaciaryna Pinčuk (2005): flutes, shawms

References

Literature

External links
 Official website
 Bandcamp
 Fan site
 Fan forum
 Photo Report from Minsk concert

Belarusian folk music groups
Belarusian rock music groups
Medieval musical groups
Belarusian-language singers
Musical groups established in 1999